Frances Lynch is a Welsh archaeologist. She is an Honorary Research Fellow in the Department of History, Welsh History and Archaeology at Bangor University and the author of several volumes on the archaeology and prehistory of Wales.

Lynch was elected a Fellow of the Society of Antiquaries of London in 1970, and in 2016 was awarded an MBE for her work archaeology and heritage. In 2012 the Cambrian Archaeological Association published a festchrift dedicated to Lynch.

References

External links 

Living people
21st-century women
20th-century women
1938 births
Welsh scholars and academics
Welsh archaeologists
Fellows of the Society of Antiquaries of London